The Ministry of Communication, and ICT was a Tanzanian government ministry that was established in February 2008. The ministry's roles were policy formulation, monitoring and evaluation, and regulatory and legal matters pertaining to communication, information and communications technology (ICT), science, technology, and innovation.

History 
The ministry's predecessor was the Ministry of Higher Education, Science and Technology (MHEST), which was known as the Ministry of Science, Technology and Higher Education before 2005.

The ministry was later split and merged under President John Magufuli's cabinet. The science and technology remit was combined with the Ministry of Education and Vocational Training to form the Ministry of Education, Science, Technology and Vocational Training.  The communications role became part of the Ministry of Works, Transport and Communications.

Ministry institutions

Subsidiary institutions under this ministry include:

 Tanzania Atomic Energy Commission
 Tanzania Commission for Science and Technology (COSTECH) 
 Tanzania Communication Regulatory Authority
 Dar es Salaam Institute of Technology
 Mbeya University of Science and Technology
 Arusha Technical College

References

External links

C
Tanzania
Tanzania